John Vance may refer to:

John L. Vance (1839–1921), member of the United States House of Representatives
John Vance (MP) (died 1875), MP for Dublin City and later MP for Armagh City
Jack Vance, American fantasy and science fiction author